Charles W. Berger (born January 12, 1936) was an American politician in the state of Kentucky. He served in the Kentucky Senate as a Democrat from 1980 to 1996.

References

1936 births
Living people
Democratic Party Kentucky state senators
People from Harlan County, Kentucky